Kala namak is a kiln-fired rock salt with a sulphurous, pungent smell used in the Indian subcontinent. It is also known as "Himalayan black salt", Sulemani namak, bit noon, bire noon, bit loona, bit lobon, kala loon, sanchal, guma loon, or pada loon, and is manufactured from the salts mined in the regions surrounding the Himalayas.

The condiment is composed largely of sodium chloride, with several other components lending the salt its colour and smell. The smell is mainly due to its sulfur content. Because of the presence of Greigite , Iron(II,III) sulfide) in the mineral, it forms brownish-pink to dark violet translucent crystals when whole. When ground into a powder, its colour ranges from purple to pink.

Kala namak has been praised in Ayurveda and used for its perceived medical qualities.

Production
The raw material for producing Kala Namak was originally obtained from natural halite from mines in Northern India in certain locations of the Himalayas,  salt harvested from the North Indian salt lakes of Sambhar or Didwana.

Traditionally, the salt was transformed from its relatively colourless raw natural forms into the dark coloured commercially sold kala namak through a reductive chemical process that transforms some of the naturally occurring sodium sulfate of the raw salt into pungent hydrogen sulfide and sodium sulfide. This involves firing the raw salts in a kiln or furnace for 24 hours while sealed in a ceramic jar with charcoal along with small quantities of harad seeds, amla, bahera, babul bark, or natron. The fired salt melts, the chemical reaction occurs, and the salt is then cooled, stored, and aged prior to sale. Kala namak is prepared in this manner in northern India with production concentrated in Hisar district, Haryana. The salt crystals appear black and are usually ground to a fine powder that is purple.

Although the Kala Namak may have traditionally been chemically produced from impure deposits of salt (sodium chloride) with the required chemicals (small quantities of sodium sulfate, sodium bisulfate and ferric sulfate) and charcoal in a furnace it is now common to simply add the required chemicals to pure salt before firing. Reportedly, it is also possible to create similar products through reductive heat treatment of salt, 5–10% of sodium carbonate, sodium sulfate, and some sugar.

Composition
Kala namak consists primarily of sodium chloride and trace impurities of sodium sulfate, sodium bisulfate, sodium bisulfite, sodium sulfide, iron sulfide and hydrogen sulfide.

Sodium chloride provides kala namak with its salty taste, iron sulfide provides its dark violet hue, and all the sulfur compounds give kala namak its slight savory taste as well as a highly distinctive smell, with hydrogen sulfide being the most prominent contributor to the smell. The acidic bisulfates/bisulfites contribute a mildly sour taste. Although hydrogen sulfide is toxic in high concentrations, the amount present in kala namak used in food is small and thus its effects on health are negligible.

Uses

Kala namak is used extensively in South Asian cuisines of India, Pakistan, Bangladesh and Nepal as a condiment or added to chaats, chutneys, salads, fruit, raitas and many other savory snacks. Chaat masala, a South Asian spice blend, is dependent upon black salt for its characteristic sulfurous egg-like aroma. Those who are not accustomed to black salt often describe the smell as resembling flatulence. Black salt is sometimes used sparingly as a topping for fruits or snacks in North India and Pakistan. 

Kala Namak is sometimes applied to tofu in vegan egg recipes.  

Kala namak is considered a cooling spice in Ayurveda and is used as a laxative and digestive aid. It is also been noted to relieve flatulence and heartburn. It is used in Jammu to cure goitres. This salt is also used to treat hysteria and for making toothpastes by combining it with other mineral and plant ingredients. The uses for goitre and hysteria are dubious. Goitre, due to dietary iodine deficiency, would not be remedied unless iodide was present in the natural salt. In the United States, the Food and Drug Administration warned a manufacturer of dietary supplements, including one consisting of Himalayan salt, to discontinue marketing the products using unproven claims of health benefits.

See also
Black lava salt
Himalayan salt
Jugyeom
Rock salt

References

Edible salt
Ayurvedic medicaments
Indian spices
Spices
Salt industry in India
Pakistani spices
Salt industry in Pakistan